Valdensinia is a genus of fungi in the family Sclerotiniaceae. It is a monotypic genus, containing the single species Valdensinia heterodoxa.

References

External links
Index Fungorum

Sclerotiniaceae
Monotypic Ascomycota genera